The Association Scoute du Togo (A.S.T.), the national Scouting organization of Togo, was founded in 1920, and became a member of the World Organization of the Scout Movement in 1977. The coeducational Association Scoute du Togo has 9,727 members as of 2011.

Program

Activities
Work for peace is a major concern for this association and is fundamental to all its work. The national badge contains the dove of peace which symbolizes the emphasis of the association's work.

Community development is another major emphasis of the association. Scouts learn agriculture, cattle breeding, fish farming and other skills at regional Scout Centers. Each of the 27 regions have community development centers.

Sections
Louveteaux/Cubs-ages 7 to 11
Eclaireurs/Scouts-ages 12 to 17
Eclaireurs Aînés (Eclaireurs Avancés)/Senior Scouts- ages 15 to 18
Routiers/Rovers-ages 18 to 30

The Scout Motto is Toujours Prêt, Always Prepared in French.

Contacts 
The official e-mail address of Association Scoute du Togo (A.S.T.) is astscout@hotmail.com

Emblem
The membership badge of the Association Scoute du Togo contains the dove of peace which symbolizes the emphasis of the association's work.

See also
Association des Guides du Togo

References

World Organization of the Scout Movement member organizations
Scouting and Guiding in Togo
Youth organizations established in 1920